Radovnica is a village in the municipality of Trgovište, in southeastern Serbia. According to the 2002 census, the village has a population of 998 people.

References

Populated places in Pčinja District